Cosme Barrutia Iturriagoitia (27 September 1929 – 12 November 2005) was a Spanish cyclist. Professional between 1949 and 1960, he had 20 victories, including the 1955 Circuito de Getxo and 1956 Klasika Primavera.

His brother Antonio was also a professional cyclist.

Major results

1953
 1st  National Cyclo-cross Championships
 1st  Overall Gran Premio Ayuntamiento de Bilbao
1st Stage 1
 3rd Circuito de Getxo
 3rd Subida a Arrate
 8th Overall Vuelta a Asturias
1st Stage 5
1954
 2nd Prueba Villafranca de Ordizia
1955
 1st Circuito de Getxo
 1st GP Portugalete
 9th Overall Vuelta a España
1956
 1st Klasika Primavera
 6th Overall Vuelta a Asturias
1st Stage 5
1957
 2nd Overall Vuelta Ciclista a La Rioja

References

External links

1929 births
2005 deaths
Spanish male cyclists
Sportspeople from Biscay
People from Durangaldea
Cyclists from the Basque Country (autonomous community)